Norlevorphanol is an opioid analgesic of the morphinan family that was never marketed. It is the levo-isomer of 3-hydroxymorphinan (morphinan-3-ol). Norlevorphanol is a Schedule I Narcotic controlled substance in the United States with an ACSCN of 9634 and in 2014 it had an annual aggregate manufacturing quota of 52 grams. It is used as the hydrobromide (free base conversion ratio 0.750) and hydrochloride (0.870).

See also
 Levallorphan
 Levorphanol
 Levomethorphan

References

Phenols
Analgesics
Morphinans
Mu-opioid receptor agonists
Synthetic opioids
Enantiopure drugs